Wilkesboro Presbyterian Church is a historic church at 205 E. Main Street in Wilkesboro, North Carolina. It was built in 1849–50 in the Greek Revival style then popular, with a prominent tetrastyle portico. The brick exterior is otherwise plain, with a somewhat incongruous Victorian-era belfry over the portico. The interior is similarly plain, with plastered walls and a wood board ceiling. The church was built by a man named Dameron for $1,040.

The building was added to the National Register of Historic Places in 1982.  It is located in the Downtown Wilkesboro Historic District.

References

Presbyterian churches in North Carolina
Churches on the National Register of Historic Places in North Carolina
Churches completed in 1849
19th-century Presbyterian church buildings in the United States
Churches in Wilkes County, North Carolina
National Register of Historic Places in Wilkes County, North Carolina
1849 establishments in North Carolina
Historic district contributing properties in North Carolina